Charles Wesley Lamb (1891 – 12 July 1965) was a Progressive Conservative party member of the House of Commons of Canada. He was born in Prince Albert, Ontario and became an auctioneer and businessman by career.

He was first elected at the Victoria riding in the 1963 general election, but died in office before completing his term in the 26th Parliament.

External links
 

1891 births
1965 deaths
Members of the House of Commons of Canada from Ontario
Progressive Conservative Party of Canada MPs